Gogyoshi (五行詩) is a style of Japanese poem that consists of a title and five lines. Japanese poet Tekkan Yosano published the original form of gogyoshi with specific syllable counts for each line in 1910, but few poets wrote in the style. In the 2000s, some Japanese poets began writing modern gogyoshi without syllabic restrictions, and modern gogyoshi have since been defined only by having five lines.  Therefore, gogyoshi is considered the freest of Japanese poetic forms, as the poems do not have syllabic restrictions, specific line breaks, or a rhyme scheme.  However, the style differs from other five-line forms, such as tanka and gogyohka, by the titling of its poems. Mariko Sumikura used gogyoshi as an English word for the first time in 2009. In 2018, Tarō Aizu proposed World Gogyoshi, which is written in two languages, English and each mother tongue, and he has been publishing the anthology of World Gogyoshi every year.

World Gogyoshi
World Gogyoshi has seven rules by Taro Aizu.(December 25,2019) 
 
1. World Gogyoshi is based on Japanese Gogyoshi and English Pentastich.
2. World Gogyoshi has a title and the title is written in all capital letters.
3. World Gogyoshi is written in only five lines.
4. Each line of World Gogyoshi is written as brief as possible.
5. World Gogyoshi is written in both English and mother tongue.
6. The first letter of each line is written in a capital letter.
7. The purpose of World Gogyoshi is World Friendship.

Sources
Mariko Sumikura, Yume tsumugu hito, Chikurinkan (2009),  C0092 
Mariko Sumikura, Ai matou hito, Chikurinkan (2010),  C0092 
Mariko Sumikura Hikari Oru Hito, Chikurinkan (2010),  C0092 
Mariko Sumikura, Tsuchi daku masurao, Chikurinkan (2011), 
Kaoru Tanaka, Fragrant Winds, Kunpuan(2009)
Taro Aizu, The Lovely Earth, Lulu Press(2011), 
Taro Aizu, La Terre Précieuse, Lulu Press(2011), 
Taro Aizu,わが福島 My Fukushima Mon Fukushima, Fueisya (2014), 
 Steve Wilkinson, Ripples on the Pond: a tanshi collection, CreateSpace Independent Publishing Platform(2015), 
 Steve Wilkinson, The Bamboo Hut Autumn 2015: A journal of tanshi, CreateSpace Independent Publishing Platform (2015), 
Atunis Galaxy Anthology – 2018
 Taro Aizu, Sigma Sathish, Niladri Mahajan, The First Anthology of World Gogyoshi 2019, Independently published (April 5, 2019)
Taro Aizu, The Second Anthology Of World Gogyoshi 2020, Independently published (December 22, 2019)
Taro Aizu, The Third Anthology Of World Gogyoshi 2021, Independently published (December 27, 2020)
Taro Aizu, The Fourth Anthology of World Gogyoshi 2022, Poetry Planet Book Publishing House(2022)
Taro Aizu, 世界五行詩集 いとしい地球よ3 World Gogyoshi The Lovely Earth 3 Yubunsya, 2022 
Taro Aizu, The Fifth Anthology of World Gogyoshi 2023, Poetry Planet Book Publishing House(2022/12/24)

See also

 Japanese poetry
 Cinquain
 Limerick (poetry)

References

External links 
The gogyoshi by Taro Aizu ProjectMailArtBooks
Gogyoshi – Short poems for Long days
Gogyoshi Monthly Issue one by Steve Wilkinson - issuu

Poetic forms
Japanese poetry